In the United States, indecent exposure refers to conduct undertaken in a non-private or (in some jurisdictions) publicly viewable location, which is deemed indecent in nature, such as nudity, masturbation or sexual intercourse. Such activity is often illegal. The legal definition in a given location may not specify all activities that would be covered.

Indecent exposure may also be referred to as "sexual misconduct" or "public lewdness".

Legal status

History
The issue of flashing or indecent exposure can be traced back in the United States as early as the 1870s as demonstrated in this 1874 Sacramento Daily Union article which reads:

A Shameless Fellow Shot in San Jose San Jose, California December 2d. [1874] For several days past, an Italian, who refuses to give his name, has been in the habit of standing on the corner of Fourth and Julian Streets in the city, and making an exposure of his person to school children. This morning complaint was made at the police office, and the officers Keane and Vance were detailed to arrest him.  About 4 o'clock this afternoon, after the officers had arrested him ...

In some areas of the United States of America in the early 1900s, women were expected to wear cumbersome dresses and pantaloon combinations when swimming. In 1907, Annette Kellerman, an Australian swimmer, was arrested on a Boston beach for public indecency for wearing her trademark one-piece swimsuit. After a public outcry at the arrest, the style had become generally acceptable by the 1910s.

Laws
In the United States, states have differing nudity and public decency laws. In most states, state law prohibits exposure of the genitals and/or the female nipples in a public place, while in other states simple nudity is legal, but evidence of intent to shock, arouse or offend other persons (lewd conduct) is evidence of prohibited conduct.  For example, in most states, it is a criminal offense punishable by fines and/or imprisonment, and/or registered sex offender requirements and restrictions.  Some states permit local governments to set local standards.  Public nudity itself has not been a crime throughout California since a 2000 Appellate Court ruling, and prosecutions and convictions are unheard of, but arrests do still occur, though they also are unusual, and Vermont only prohibits "open and gross lewdness and lascivious behavior" so many forms of public nudity are legal.

Indecent exposure is defined as a crime in the United States Armed Forces by Article 120c, Uniform Code of Military Justice. The changes to Article 120c became part of the Manual for Courts-Martial in the 2012 edition.

In Texas, a 2021 law extended indecent exposure to online activity, in which a person sends unsolicited nude or sexual images to another individual. However, the law defined the offense as a lesser misdemeanor than in-person exposure.

Exemption for breastfeeding of infants
Most states exempt breastfeeding mothers from prosecution under these statutes. U.S. Public Law 106–58 Sec. 647., enacted in 1999, specifically provides that "a woman may breastfeed her child at any location in a Federal building or on Federal property, if the woman and her child are otherwise authorized to be present at the location."

See also
Clothing laws in the United States
United States obscenity law
List of social nudity places in the United States
Exhibitionism
Streaking
Anasyrma
Mooning

References

Sex crimes in the United States
Nudity in the United States